Patermutius was an early Christian martyr. A layman, Patermutius was one of four Christians who led Mass for the persecuted Christians condemned to work in the Palestinian quarries in the wake of the Diocletianic Persecution. When the Roman emperor Galerius learned of this, he had Patermutius burned alive along with the other leaders (Peleus, Nilus, and Elias), and the Christians dispersed to mines in Cyprus and Lebanon. He is venerated as a saint in the Roman Catholic Church and Eastern Orthodox Church.

Butler's account

The hagiographer Alban Butler wrote in his The Lives of the Fathers, Martyrs, and Other Principal Saints,

See also
Diocletianic Persecution

References

Sources

4th-century Christian martyrs
Christians martyred during the reign of Diocletian